Bhagwan Das may refer to

Bhagwan Das (1869–1958), Indian theosophist 
Bhagwan Das Garga (1924–2011), Indian documentary filmmaker and film historian
Bhagwan Das KabirPanthi, Indian politician 
Bhagwan Das Gupta (1940–1998), Nepalese politician
Bhagwant Das (1527–1589), Raja of Amber
Bhagwandas Patel (born 1943), Indian folklorist
Bhagwandas Mulchand Luthria (stage name Sudhir) (1944–2014), Bollywood actor
Bhagwandas Bagla, Burmese businessman
Bhagavan Das (yogi) (born 1945), American yogi 
Rana Bhagwandas (1942–2015), Pakistani judge
Paul Bhagwandas (1950–1996), Surinamese military officer